Nik Zaris Nelydia Binti Nik Sen (born 30 July 1994), better known by her stage name Nelydia Senrose, is a Malaysian actress. She debuted in 2007 and actively appeared in a few television dramas and popular in the drama Setia Hujung Nyawa as Ersalina, Bukan Kerana Aku Tak Cinta as Hannah Mastura dan Lafazkan Kalimah Cintamu as Tengku Aqilah.

Acting career
At the age of 13, Nelydia Senrose began her acting career by playing the supporting role Melissa in TV3's primetime series Spa Q.

Her breakthrough as an actress came when she starred with Amar Asyraf in Setia Hujung Nyawa, a drama series based on the novel of the same title where she played Ersalina.

In 2018, she appeared in two television series—the first of two is Lafazkan Kalimah Cintamu, based on a 2010 novel of the same name where she played Tengku Aqilah, opposite Farid Kamil as Tengku Ryan Ameer. She was later cast as Ara in Cinta Tiada Ganti, a remake of 2003 Filipino telenovela, Sana'y Wala Nang Wakas.

Personal life
Nelydia is the third of eight siblings. She is of Siamese and Malay ancestry. She comes from Kota Bharu, Kelantan and stays in Kuala Lumpur, Malaysia. Nelydia's elder sister, Uqasha Senrose, is also an actress.

Nelydia graduated from Sekolah Menengah USJ 13, Subang Jaya when she was 17 years old. Nelydia got 6A's in Sijil Pelajaran Malaysia (Certificate Education of Malaysia) (SPM) and is studying Psychology at SEGI College.

Nelydia married businessman Mohd Hafez Halimi Abdul Hamid on 6 April 2019.

Filmography

Film

Television series

Telemovie
{| class="wikitable"
! Year
! Title
! Role
! TV channel
|-
| 2009
| Anak Aku Artis
| 
| Astro Ria
|-
| rowspan="3"|2011
| Iqra'''
| 
| rowspan="2"|TV3
|-
| Khalifah| Siti Mariam
|-
| Si Tudung Tweet| Kamariah
| TV9
|-
| rowspan="3" | 2013
| Setia Hujung Nyawa Raya| Ersalina Imani 
| TV3
|-
|Hi Papa|Aleeya
|Astro Ceria
|-
|Cinta Laila Majnun|Laila
|Astro Oasis
|-
| rowspan="3" |2014
|Bibik I Artis|Bibik Mek
|TV3
|-
|Ada Apa Dengan Raya|
|Astro Ria
|-
| Strawberi Dan Karipap: Sesat Di Paris| rowspan="2" |Aunty Lisa
| rowspan="2" |Astro First Exclusive 
|- 
| rowspan="2" | 2015
| Strawberi Dan Karipap: Hello Gold Coast|-
|Cik Puan Bibik|
|TV1
|- 
| 2016
| Crush Next Door| Hani
| Astro Ria
|- 
|}

Television

Philanthropy
In July 2013, the Malaysian private, free-to-air television channel, TV3 appointed Senrose along with Adi Putra, Nora Danish, Fiza Sabjahan, Amar Asyraf, Neelofa, Tasha Shilla and Aiman Hakim Ridza as the ambassador for Anugerah Syawal 2013''. According to TV3 "The appointment of these celebrities is to promote programs on television and radio throughout the month of Shawwal."

Awards and nominations

References

External links

 

1994 births
People from Kota Bharu
Malaysian television actresses
Living people
Malaysian people of Malay descent
Malaysian people of Thai descent
21st-century Malaysian actresses
Malaysian television personalities
People from Kelantan
Malaysian film actresses